László Farkas (born 18 December 1941) is a Hungarian sailor. He competed in the Star event at the 1968 Summer Olympics.

References

External links
 

1941 births
Living people
Hungarian male sailors (sport)
Olympic sailors of Hungary
Sailors at the 1968 Summer Olympics – Star
People from Veszprém
Sportspeople from Veszprém County